Anbi (also Romanized as Anbī; also known as Ābnī and Ambi) is a village in Targavar Rural District, Silvaneh District, Urmia County, West Azerbaijan Province, Iran. At the 2006 census, its population was 1,066, in 185 families.

References 

Populated places in Urmia County